Mamoutou Diarra (born May 21, 1980) is a French former professional basketball player.

Professional career
Diarra began his professional career with AS Bondy 93 of the French Second Division in 1999. He then moved to the French First Division club Paris Racing Basket, where he played from 2000 to 2005. He then moved to Chalon, where he played from 2005 to 2007.

He played with the Greek League club PAOK from 2007 to 2009. He then joined the Italian League club Air Avellino, before moving to the French League club Chorale Roanne. In 2010, he moved to the Greek League club Maroussi., but due to the economic problems of the Greek club he returned to French Pro A signing a one-year contract with Cholet. In March 2014, he signed with Orléans Loiret Basket.

In June 2014, he signed with Olympique Antibes of the LNB Pro B. After two seasons, he left Antibes.

National team career
As a member of the senior men's French national basketball team, Diarra won the bronze medal at EuroBasket 2005, and he also played at the 2006 FIBA World Championship.

Personal life
Diarra is the brother of the rapper Oxmo Puccino.

References

External links
Italian League profile 
Eurobasket.com profile
FIBA.com profile

1980 births
Living people
Centre Fédéral de Basket-ball players
Cholet Basket players
Chorale Roanne Basket players
Élan Chalon players
French men's basketball players
French people of Malian descent
Forwards (basketball)
Guards (basketball)
Nanterre 92 players
Orléans Loiret Basket players
P.A.O.K. BC players
Paris Racing Basket players
Shooting guards
Small forwards
Basketball players from Paris
2006 FIBA World Championship players